Firthside is a neighbourhood within the suburb of Kingston, in the greater Hobart area, capital of Tasmania, Australia.  It is located on the northern edge of the Kingston urban area.

Firthside offers all the conveniences of Kingston without the traffic due to the easy access to/from the Southern Outlet.

The Firthside area was originally settled by Dutch migrants.

It is the location of the Manor Gardens Club

Notes

Suburbs of Hobart
Localities of Kingborough Council